Global Conversations is a public affairs show produced by Nine Media Corporation which has been broadcast by CNN Philippines since 2015 which talks about some of the international issues from CNN programs like The Situation Room hosted by Wolf Blitzer, Anderson Cooper 360 hosted by Anderson Cooper, Amanpour hosted by Christiane Amanpour and many others. It is hosted by Mai Rodriguez.

The program ended on August 26, 2016. Its format was carried over by Global Newsroom, which was launched four months prior to cancellation (April 11), while its timeslot was occupied by reruns of The Source.

See also
CNN Philippines
Nine Media Corporation

References

Philippine television shows
CNN Philippines original programming
CNN Philippines News and Current Affairs
English-language television shows
2015 Philippine television series debuts
2016 Philippine television series endings